A specialist firearms officer (SFO) is a British police officer who has undergone training in the use of police firearms to a more advanced level than authorised firearms officers (AFOs). SFOs receive additional training in areas such as building assault and specialist weapon usage. The common role of an SFO is to assault premises involved in a siege situation, effect high-risk firearms related arrests and respond to terrorist threats.

In 2012, a higher-qualification, known as Counter Terrorist Specialist Firearms Officer (CTSFO) was established by the Metropolitan Police Service prior to the 2012 Summer Olympics with other police forces, including Thames Valley Police, West Yorkshire Police, West Midlands Police, Strathclyde Police and Greater Manchester Police trained in this qualification to assist the MPS with the Olympics. The MPS has replaced the SFO qualification with CT-SFO.

Legal status of the use of firearms

The usage of firearms by the police is covered by statute (such as the Police and Criminal Evidence Act 1984 and Human Rights Act 1998), policy (such as the Home Office Code of Practice on Police use of Firearms and Less Lethal Weapons and the ACPO Manual of Guidance on Police Use of Firearms) and common law.

United Kingdom law allows the use of "reasonable force" in order to make an arrest or prevent a crime or to defend one's self or another. However, if the force used is fatal, then the European Convention of Human Rights only allows "the use of force which is no more than absolutely necessary". Firearms officers may therefore only discharge their weapons "to stop an imminent threat to life".

ACPO policy states that "use" of a firearm includes both pointing it at a person and discharging it (whether accidentally, negligently or on purpose).
As with all use of force in England and Wales, it is responsibility of the individual officer to justify their actions.

Training

Potential SFOs receive extensive training in:
 Safe use of specialist firearms
 Method of entry techniques to gain access to premises quickly
 Abseiling and 'fast rope' skills
 Scenario training (such as being instructed to search a specially adapted training area of an aircraft)
 Use of tear gas and stun grenades
 Hostage rescue and handling techniques
 Computer simulated 'war games' of potential threats, such as terrorist attacks 
 The use of protective clothing against CBRN attack

Weapons used 
Non lethal:
37mm Baton gun,
X26 Taser (stun gun).
Standard UK police equipment

See also 
Police use of firearms in the United Kingdom
Counter Terrorist Specialist Firearms Officer

References

External links
 By the book: how force trains its firearms unit
 Life of crime: firearms on the streets

Police positions in the United Kingdom